The Hartsville Nuclear Plant is a canceled nuclear power plant project located near Hartsville, Tennessee.  To be built and operated by the Tennessee Valley Authority, it was to have four General Electric boiling water reactors.

Land along the Cumberland River was acquired by TVA in the late 1960s for construction of the plant which was to accommodate the electricity demand for the 1980s.  Construction began in 1975.  The Plant B reactors were canceled on March 22, 1983 and the Plant A reactors were canceled on August 29, 1984.

There are currently plans to turn  of the  property into an industrial park similar to what became of the Satsop Nuclear Plant in Washington. The Trousdale Turner Correctional Center, a private prison operated by CoreCivic, began operations on the site in 2016.

References

External links
Part of Hartsville site being sold (2002)
NukeWorker pictures of plants

Buildings and structures in Smith County, Tennessee
Buildings and structures in Trousdale County, Tennessee
Unfinished nuclear reactors
Cancelled nuclear power stations in the United States